The OnePlus 10 Pro 5G is a high-end Android-based smartphone manufactured by OnePlus, unveiled on January 11, 2022. Succeeding the OnePlus 9 Pro, the phone also features upgraded cameras developed with Hasselblad.

References

External links 

OnePlus mobile phones
Phablets
Android (operating system) devices
Mobile phones introduced in 2022
Mobile phones with multiple rear cameras
Mobile phones with 8K video recording